The 2008–09 Stuttgarter Kickers season was the 109th season in the club's football history. In 2008–09 the club played in the new founded 3. Liga, the third tier of German football. The club also has taken part in the 2008–09 edition of the Wurttemberg Cup.

Squad information

Squad and statistics

Reserve team
Kickers' reserve team finished 7th in the Oberliga Baden-Württemberg and were coached by Björn Hinck.

External links
 2008–09 Stuttgarter Kickers season at Kickersarchiv.de 
 2008–09 Stuttgarter Kickers season at Weltfussball.de 
 2008–09 Stuttgarter Kickers season at kicker.de 
 2008–09 Stuttgarter Kickers season at Fussballdaten.de 

Stuttgarter Kickers
Stuttgarter Kickers seasons